Oakwood provides a specialist provision for young people aged 16 – 25 years, designed to meet the needs of those with Learning difficulties and disabilities, including Autism, Social Emotional and Mental Health (SEMH) conditions and complex behaviour. The college has two campuses, one in Dawlish on the Devon Coastline and the other in Torpoint in South East Cornwall.

References

Special education in the United Kingdom
Special schools in Devon
Further education colleges in Devon
Dawlish